The 1953 Formula One season was the seventh season of the FIA's Formula One racing. It consisted only of several non-championship motor races.

The 4th FIA World Championship of Drivers, which commenced on 18 January and ended on 13 September after nine races, was won by Alberto Ascari, driving for a Scuderia Ferrari. Ascari became the first driver to successfully defend his title.

In addition to the non-championship Formula One races and the World Championship Formula Two races, numerous other non-championship Formula Two races were also held during the year.

World Championship season summary
Ferrari drivers again dominated the championship, taking seven of the eight Grands Prix. However, Juan Manuel Fangio's challenge in his more fragile Maserati took him to second place in the championship and a win at Monza. Ascari extended his unbeaten run to nine consecutive World Championship Grand Prix wins before his teammate Mike Hawthorn broke the sequence in becoming the first-ever British winner in the French Grand Prix at Reims after a thrilling battle with Fangio.

In 1953, all but one of the races counting towards the World Championship of Drivers were run under Formula 2 regulations, while the remaining one, the Indianapolis 500, was run under AAA Championship Car regulations. The 1953 championship was the first genuinely global World Championship of Drivers, with a championship event staged outside of Europe or the United States for the first time. That race, the 1953 Argentine Grand Prix, was marred by an accident involving the Ferrari of Giuseppe Farina, which crashed into an unprotected crowd, killing nine spectators.

World Championship season review

The 1953 World Championship of Drivers was contested over a nine-race series.

The Spanish Grand Prix, scheduled to be staged on 26 October, was cancelled for monetary reasons. The Indianapolis 500 also counted towards the 1953 AAA Championship.

Teams and drivers

World Championship of Drivers standings

Championship points were awarded to the first five finishers in each race on an 8–6–4–3–2 basis. Points for shared drives were divided equally between the drivers, regardless of the number of laps driven by each. One point was also awarded for the fastest lap in each race. The point was shared equally between drivers sharing the fastest lap. Only the best four results from the nine races counted towards a driver's total points in the World Championship. In the points column, numbers without parentheses are retained championship points, and numbers within parentheses are total points scored.

 † Position shared between more drivers of the same car
 * Point for fastest lap shared between different drivers.
 ‡ Several cars were shared in this race. See the race page for details.

Non-championship races
The following Formula One/Formula Two/Formula Libre races, which did not count towards the World Championship of Drivers, were held in 1953.

East German races

The Bernau race was not part of the East German Championship.

East German Championship
The table below shows the points awarded for each race. Only East German drivers were eligible for points.

References

Formula One seasons
 
Formula Two series